Popular Unions of Bipartisan Social Groups (LEFKO) is a minor Greek political party.

Tha party was established in June 1989 by Konstantinos Dalios, who in 1981 was MP candidate with Union of the Democratic Centre. Dalios is the leader of the party.

Electoral results and tactics

External links
 

Political parties established in 1989
1989 establishments in Greece